WKJD is a radio station in broadcasting on 90.3 MHz FM, licensed to Columbus, Indiana. The station airs a Contemporary Christian music format, and is owned by Good Shepherd Radio, Inc.

References

External links
WKJD's official website

Contemporary Christian radio stations in the United States
Radio stations established in 1988
KJD